The UAAP Season 84 men's basketball tournament is the basketball event of the University Athletic Association of the Philippines for its 2021–22 school year. This was the first tournament since 2019, the year before the COVID-19 pandemic hit the Philippines. The women's, boys' and girls' basketball tournaments were not held this season, also due to the pandemic.

Tournament format 
The usual UAAP tournament format for tournaments having all eight teams was followed:

 Double round eliminations; top four teams advance to the playoffs
 If there is a tie for second or fourth, a one-game playoff will be held
 If a team wins all elimination round games:
 #1 seed advance to the finals outright
 #2 seed advance to the second round of the stepladder semifinals with the twice-to-beat advantage; winner advances to the finals
 #3 and #4 seeds advance to the first round of the stepladder semifinals in a one-game playoff; winner advances to the second round
 If no team wins all elimination round games:
 #1 seed with the twice-to-beat advantage vs #4 seed in the semifinals
 #2 seed with the twice-to-beat advantage vs #3 seed in the semifinals
 The finals is a best-of-three series.

Teams 
All eight universities are participating.

Coaching changes

Venue 
The SM Mall of Asia Arena in Pasay hosted the opening ceremonies and all the games. All games were held behind closed doors in a full bubble setup during the first four playing dates of the first round, meaning no fans were allowed inside the playing venue. However, on April 5, 2022, which was the fifth playing date of the basketball tournament, the UAAP allowed fans in a limited capacity to watch live at the Mall of Asia Arena.

Squads 
Due to the ongoing COVID-19 pandemic, teams were permitted to have 20 players in their rosters instead of the previous 16. The four additional players can be tapped only for COVID-related reasons.

Imports 
Each UAAP team can have one foreigner player, or an import, termed as "foreign student-athletes (FSA)" by the UAAP in the 16-man lineup, but can have as many in their reserve list.

With Ange Kouame's then impending naturalization, Ateneo coach Tab Baldwin said that they are not planning to get another FSA to replace Koaume's FSA slot on the roster.

Elimination round

Team standings

Match-up results

Scores 
Results on top and to the right of the grey cells are for first-round games; those to the bottom and to the left of it are second-round games.

Bracket 

*Overtime

Semifinals 
UP and Ateneo have the twice-to-beat advantage. They only have to win once, while their opponents, twice, to progress.

Ateneo vs. FEU 
This is the first meeting between Ateneo and FEU in the semifinals since 2018 and seventh overall. Ateneo kept its #1 seed from the last three tournaments, while FEU is on its eighth consecutive playoff appearance.

UP vs. La Salle 
This is the first meeting between UP and La Salle in the semifinals in UAAP men's basketball history. UP is on its third straight playoffs appearance, and its second consecutive tournament with the twice-to-beat advantage. La Salle returned to the semifinals for the first time since 2017 after missing out in the past two tournaments.

Finals 
The finals is a best-of-three series. This is the fifth consecutive finals for Ateneo, and since 2018, the second appearance for UP in the Final Four era, and the second Battle of Katipunan finals, named after Katipunan Avenue that runs between the two campuses.

 Finals Most Valuable Player:

Awards

 Most Valuable Player: 
 Rookie of the Year: 
 Mythical Team:
 
 
 
 
 
 PSBankable Player of the Season:

Statistical leaders

Season player highs 
These were for games played during the elimination round.

See also 

 NCAA Season 97 basketball tournaments

References 

84
Basketball events postponed due to the COVID-19 pandemic
2021–22 in Philippine college basketball